Chuñuna (possibly from Quechua ch'uñu a freeze-dried potato, -na a suffix, "where ch'uñu is made") is mountain in the Vilcanota mountain range in the Andes of Peru, about  high. It is located in the Cusco Region, Quispicanchi Province, on the border of the districts of Marcapata and Ocongate. Chuñuna lies southwest of Ancahuachana and southeast of  Jolljepunco and Velacota.

References 

Mountains of Cusco Region
Mountains of Peru